Robert Mohr (born 25 August 1978) is a retired German international rugby union player, having played professionally in France for Bourgoin, La Rochelle, Niort and for the German national rugby union team. He is one of the few players in the history of the German team who was a professional.

Biography
Mohr was born in Hannover on 25 August 1978.

He played for Bourgoin in the Heineken Cup in 1999–2000.

Mohr scored a try in Germany's home game against Spain in the qualifying for the 2007 Rugby World Cup, which the team won.

The German rugby federation repeatedly tried to have Mohr released for the team but his club refused despite being obliged to.

Mohr and his club, La Rochelle, finished in the top five of the French second division in each season from 2007 through 2010. After failing to earn promotion in the first three seasons, losing in the promotion semi-finals in 2008 and 2009 and in the final in 2007, the club finally broke through with a win over Lyon in the 2010 promotion final. After ten years with La Rochelle he announced his departure from the club in 2012. Being thought after by German club DSV 78 Hannover he decided to stay in France and join third division side Stade Niortais instead. He played his last competitive rugby match on 6 April 2013, when he fielded for Germany against Sweden in a 73–17 victory. Mohr retired after this match from international and club rugby and will work for a drink vending machine manufacturer and also act as a talent scout for La Rochelle. He however returned to the German team one more time in May 2014 in the decisive world cup qualifier against Russia which Germany lost.

He was part of Germany's 7's side at the 2009 Hannover Sevens.

Honours

Club
 Rugby Pro D2
 Runners-up: 2007
 Promotion final winner: 2010

Stats
Robert Mohr's personal statistics in club and international rugby:

Club

 As of 30 April 2012

National team

 As of 4 December 2013

References

External links
 Robert Mohr profile at totalrugby.de
 Robert Mohr profile at the Stade Rochelais website
 Mohr Robert player stats 

1978 births
Living people
German rugby union players
Germany international rugby union players
CS Bourgoin-Jallieu players
Stade Rochelais players
Expatriate rugby union players in France
Rugby union in Hanover
Rugby union number eights
German expatriate rugby union players
German expatriate sportspeople in France
Sportspeople from Hanover